Iraqw is a Cushitic language spoken in Tanzania in the Arusha and Manyara Regions. It is expanding in numbers as the Iraqw people absorb neighbouring ethnic groups. The language has many Datooga loanwords, especially in poetic language. The Gorowa language to the south shares numerous similarities and is sometimes considered a dialect.

Phonology

Vowels
Whiteley (1958) lists the following vowel phonemes for Iraqw. All of the vowels except /ə/ occur in both short and long versions:

 can be heard as  within the environment of pharyngeal consonants.

Consonants
Whiteley (1958) and Mous (1993) list the following consonants:

In the popular orthography for Iraqw used in Lutheran and Catholic materials as well as in collections of traditional Iraqw stories and academic literature (e.g. Nordbustad 1988, Mous 1993 ), the majority of the orthography follows the Swahili orthography with the addition of x and q. Consonants /ɲ, tʃ, dʒ, ʃ/ mainly occur from loanwords of Swahili and Datooga (Mous 1993:19).

Morphology

Noun morphology

Gender
Nouns in Iraqw have three genders: masculine, feminine, and neuter.  The gender of a noun can be deduced from the type of agreement that it triggers on other elements in the sentence, but the agreement system is unusual, and obeys the following principle (Mous 1993:41):

 Masculine nouns require the masculine form of the verb
 Feminine nouns require the feminine form of the verb
 Neuter nouns require the plural form of the verb

The masculine, feminine, and plural forms of the verb are identified by the form the verb takes when the subject is pronoun which is a.) a third person masculine singular ('he'), b.) a third person feminine singular ('she'), or c.) a third person plural ('they').

There are several unusual things that are worth noting. One is that 'tail' is neuter in the singular and feminine in the plural; despite this, the plural verb form is used for 'tail', since it is neuter, and neuters use the plural verb form. This is why "plural" is often used as a label for this gender; plural gender is common in a number of Cushitic languages. Another is that the verbs do not agree with their subjects in number, so the masculine plural daaqay 'boys' takes the masculine form of the verb, not the plural form of the verb.

Number

Nouns typically have separate singular and plural forms, but there are many distinct plural suffixes. Mous (1993:44) reports that there are fourteen different plural suffixes. The lexical entry for a noun must specify the particular plural suffix it takes.

The gender of a plural noun is usually different from the gender of the corresponding singular. Compare the following singular and plural nouns, with their genders:

While it is not possible to predict the gender of a noun or which plural suffix it will take, the form of the plural suffix determines the gender of the plural noun. So, for example, all plural nouns with the /-eemo/ suffix are neuter (Mous 1993:58).

Construct case suffixes and gender linkers

The gender of a noun is important for predicting the construct case suffix and the gender linker that it will use. When a noun is directly followed by
an adjective
a possessive noun phrase
a numeral
a relative clause
a verb
then a construct case suffix must appear after the noun. The construct case marker is /-ú/ or /-kú/ for masculine nouns; /-Hr/ or /-tá/ for feminine nouns; and /-á/ for neuter nouns (Mous 1993:95-96):

The gender linkers are similar to the construct cases suffixes, but appear between the noun and other suffixes (such as the demonstrative, indefinite, and possessive suffixes).  The following example shows masculine, feminine, and neuter nouns before the 'their' possessive suffix and the demonstrative -qá' 'that (far, but visible)' (Mous 1993:90-92)

Adverbial case clitics 
Iraqw has four adverbial case clitics: the directive, the ablative, the instrumental and the reason case clitics. Adverbial case clitics occur in the position immediately before the verb and are cliticised to the preceding noun with the gender linker, or they might occur in a position after the verb, in which case they are obligatorily followed by a resumptive pronoun alé.

Syntax

Noun phrases

The noun comes first in the noun phrase, and precedes possessors, adjectives, numerals, and relative clauses.  An element called the construct case suffix appears between the noun and these modifiers, as discussed in the Morphology section above:

Sentences
An Iraqw sentence contains a verb in final position, and an auxiliary-like element called the 'selector'.  Either the subject or the object of the sentence may precede the selector (Mous 2004:110), and the selector agrees with the preceding noun.  So in the first example below, iri shows agreement with /ameenirdá'  'that woman', and in the second example, uná shows agreement with gitladá' :

References

Further reading
 Bayo, Phaustini. 2023. “A Sociopragmatic Analysis of Address Terms in Iraqw.” Arusha Working Papers in African Linguistics, 5(1): 31-50.
 Mous, Maarten. 1993. A Grammar of Iraqw. Hamburg: Buske.
 Mous, Maarten. 2023. “The Emergence of Lexical Applicatives in Iraqw.” Arusha Working Papers in African Linguistics, 5(1): 3-30.
 Mous, Maarten, Martha Qorro, Roland Kießling. 2002. Iraqw-English Dictionary. With an English and a Thesaurus Index. Cushitic Language Studies Volume 18.
 Whiteley, W.H. 1958. A Short Description of Item Categories in Iraqw. Kampala:East African Institute of Social Research.

External links
 Iraqw language topical vocabulary list (from the World Loanword Database)

South Cushitic languages
Languages of Tanzania